Don't Be Shallow is an EP by Sondre Lerche, released as a limited edition on 23 September 2003. It comprises two songs left over from the 2000 album Faces Down (tracks 1 and 3), and two home recordings produced in 2001 (tracks 2 and 4), followed by four exclusive live bonus tracks from Lerche's winter/spring 2003 U.S. solo tours.
The EP is also available very limitedly in Europe.

Track listing

References 

Sondre Lerche albums
2003 EPs
Live EPs
2003 live albums